The Power to Believe is the thirteenth and final studio album by English progressive rock band King Crimson. It was released on 4 March 2003 through Sanctuary Records and met with generally favourable reviews, with several critics appreciating its heightened aggression. The Power to Believe was preceded by the EP Happy with What You Have to Be Happy With (2002), which features alternate and otherwise unreleased tracks.

Background

After a tour opening for Tool in 2001, King Crimson refined and focused their four-piece structure for their second album in that configuration. Prior to its release in 2003, The Power to Believe was preceded by Level Five (2001) and Happy With What You Have to Be Happy With (2002), two EPs that functioned as work-in-progress reveals for the album, which Fripp described as "the culmination of three years of Crimsonising". While Level Five was a live release featuring two songs that would appear on the full album, Happy With What You Have to Be Happy With was a limited-edition studio release that, much like 1994's VROOOM to 1995's THRAK, featured alternate and early versions of its upcoming album's tracks.

Content and composition

Originally titled Nuovo Metal, The Power to Believe continued the aggressive and occasionally industrial experimentation of King Crimson's previous album, 2000's The Construkction of Light, with several critics appreciating its increased weight. Like that previous album, The Power to Believe was recorded with King Crimson as a four-piece.

The album derives its title from "The Power to Believe", a four-part suite of songs that runs throughout the album. The phrase originally appeared in the song "All Her Love Is Mine" from Adrian Belew's 1996 solo album Op Zop Too Wah. The album's second track, "Level Five", acts as the fifth and final entry in the "Larks' Tongues in Aspic" suite, which began with parts one and two from the 1973 album Larks' Tongues in Aspic. Lindsay Planer of AllMusic wrote that "Level Five" "is so intense that it could easily be mistaken for the likes of Tool, Ministry, Nine Inch Nails, or KMFDM."

The introduction track to "Facts of Life" features a sample of "The Outer Darkness II: Perimeter I", from Fripp's 1998 album The Gates of Paradise.

Critical reception

The Power to Believe was met with mostly positive reviews. The album received an average score of 72/100 from 8 reviews on Metacritic, indicating "generally favorable reviews". AllMusic's Lindsay Planer praised the album's aggression and "sonic belligerence", writing, "If the bandmembers' constant tone probing is an active search to find the unwitting consciousness of a decidedly younger, rowdier, and more demanding audience, their collective mission is most assuredly accomplished on The Power to Believe -- even more so than the tripped-out psychedelic prog rock behemoth from whence(sic) they initially emerged." David Fricke of Rolling Stone appreciated the album's contrast of heavy, frightening periods against peaceful moments, concluding with, "In the face of war, King Crimson make hopeful thunder." In their 2003 review, Mojo wrote, "This is a more consistent set, and, hopefully, a revelation for a few young metal heads." Chris Jones of the BBC called the album "simply stunning". Still, some critics were more lukewarm on The Power to Believe. Writing for Pitchfork, Dominique Leone said, "I can admit to feeling some of that old Crim magic a few times during [the album], but would be kidding myself if I thought it was as potent a spell as their adventures of yore." Stylus Magazines Ed Howard called The Power to Believe King Crimson's best release since 1981's Discipline but thought it did not live up to the band's earliest releases.

Re-issue
In 2019, King Crimson announced that The Power to Believe would be the fifteenth and final phase of their "40th Anniversary" release schedule. An enhanced and expanded master of the album was released in hi-res stereo audio as well as lossless 5.1 Surround Sound.

Track listing
All songs written by Adrian Belew, Robert Fripp, Trey Gunn and Pat Mastelotto with lyrics by Belew, except where noted.

Personnel
Credits adapted from liner notes.King Crimson Robert Fripp – guitar
 Adrian Belew – guitar, vocals
 Pat Mastelotto – acoustic and electric drums and percussion
 Trey Gunn – Warr touch bassAdditional personnel'
David Singleton – mastering, management
Machine – production, programming, engineering, mixing
Simon Heyworth – mastering
Jeff Juliano – additional engineering
Ken Latchney – haiku voice recording
P. J. Crook – artwork
Hugh O'Donnell – sleeve design
Tim Faulkner – voice source (track 4)

Charts

References

External links
 

King Crimson albums
2003 albums
Discipline Global Mobile albums
Sanctuary Records albums
Albums produced by Machine (producer)